The Movement for Democracy, Independence and Social Progress (MDI-PS) is a political party in the Central African Republic.

History
The MDI-PS was established in 1991 as a non-sectarian party.
The party joined the opposition Consultation of Opposition Political Parties alliance for the 2005 general elections. The alliance won 11 seats, of which the MDI-PS won three.

In 2010 the party joined the Presidential Majority alliance in preparation for the 2011 general elections. The MDI-PS nominated 14 candidates for the 105 seats in the National Assembly, winning one of the alliance's 11 seats.

References

External links
Official website

1991 establishments in the Central African Republic
Political parties established in 1991
Political parties in the Central African Republic